Brush Lake is a lake in South Dakota, in the United States.

Brush Lake originally was lined with brush, hence the name.

See also
List of lakes in South Dakota

References

Lakes of South Dakota
Lakes of Brookings County, South Dakota